The Sun Fast 52 is a French sailboat that was designed by Philippe Briand as a racer-cruiser and first built in 1992.

Production
The design was built by Jeanneau in France, from 1994 until 1994, with 20 boats completed, but it is now out of production.

Design
The Sun Fast 52 is a recreational keelboat, built predominantly of fiberglass, with wood trim. It has a masthead sloop rig, a raked stem, a reverse transom with steps to a swimming platform, an internally mounted spade-type rudder controlled by a wheel and a fixed fin keel or optional shoal-draft keel. It displaces  and carries  of ballast.

The design has sleeping accommodation for six people, with either a double berth in the forward cabin, or tow forward cabins with single berths in each. There are two aft cabin with double berths under the cockpit. The salon has an "L"-shaped settee and a straight settee around a table. The galley is located on the starboard side amidships. The galley is straight in configuration and is equipped with a four-burner stove, a refrigerator and freezer and dual sinks. A navigation station is aft of the galley, on the starboard side. There are two heads, one in the bow and one on the port side aft.

Operational history
The boat was at one time supported by a class club that organized racing events, the Sun Fast Association.

See also
List of sailing boat types

References

External links

Video Tour of a Sun Fast 52

Keelboats
1990s sailboat type designs
Sailing yachts
Sailboat type designs by Philippe Briand
Sailboat types built by Jeanneau